The Men's super combined competition of the 2018 Winter Paralympics was held at Jeongseon Alpine Centre,
South Korea. The competition took place on 13 March 2018.

Medal table

Visually impaired
In the downhill visually impaired, the athlete with a visual impairment has a sighted guide. The two skiers are considered a team, and dual medals are awarded.

The super-G was started at 11:15 and the slalom was started at 16:02.

Standing
The super-G was started at 11:50 and the slalom was started at 16:22.

Sitting
The super-G was started at 12:25 and the slalom at 16:42.

See also
Alpine skiing at the 2018 Winter Olympics

References

Men's super combined